Acacia farinosa, commonly known as mealy wattle, is a  shrub that is endemic to Australia.  
It grows to between 1 and 2 metres high and has ascending phyllodes. The yellow globular flower heads generally appear between August and October in its native range. These are followed by curled and twisted pods which are up to 6 cm long and 2–3 mm wide.

The species was formally described by English botanist John Lindley in 1838 from material collected on Thomas Mitchell's expedition near Lake Charm, Victoria in 1836. The description was published in Mitchell's  Three Expeditions into the interior of Eastern Australia. The name Acacia whanii F.Muell. ex Benth. has been misapplied to this species.

The species occurs naturally in shrubland and woodland in South Australia and Victoria.
It often occurs in association with Eucalyptus incrassata and Melaleuca uncinata.

Cultivation
The species may be used as a groundcover in coastal areas.

References

External links

 
 

farinosa
Flora of South Australia
Flora of Victoria (Australia)
Fabales of Australia